Ernest Todd Mitchell (born July 26, 1966) is an American retired professional basketball player. He was a 6'7" (200 cm) 205 lb (93 kg) small forward, and played college basketball at Purdue University, from 1984 to 1988.

College career

Born in Toledo, Ohio, Mitchell attended Purdue University, located in West Lafayette, Indiana, where he played basketball under head coach Gene Keady. Along with teammate Troy Lewis, he led the Boilermakers to two Big Ten Conference titles during his Junior and Senior seasons, along with a Sweet Sixteen appearance in the 1988 NCAA Tournament. He was named First Team All-Big Ten in both his junior and senior year.

Professional career

Mitchell was the 43rd overall pick in the 1988 NBA draft by the Denver Nuggets in the 2nd round. He played one season in the NBA. In his lone season split with the San Antonio Spurs and the Miami Heat, he averaged 5.1 points, 2.1 rebounds and 0.9 assists per game.

He spent parts of 3 seasons in the Continental Basketball Association; averaging 18.4 ppg over his 92-game career.

His European League career spanned 9 seasons, he spent one season in the Israeli League.

References

External links
nba.com/historical/playerfile

1966 births
Living people
African-American basketball players
All-American college men's basketball players
American expatriate basketball people in France
American expatriate basketball people in Greece
American expatriate basketball people in Israel
American expatriate basketball people in Italy
American expatriate basketball people in Spain
American expatriate basketball people in Switzerland
American men's basketball players
Basketball players from Ohio
Cholet Basket players
Denver Nuggets draft picks
Greek Basket League players
La Crosse Catbirds players
Liga ACB players
Lugano Tigers players
Miami Heat players
Montpellier Paillade Basket players
Olympiacos B.C. players
Papagou B.C. players
Purdue Boilermakers men's basketball players
Rapid City Thrillers players
Rockford Lightning players
San Antonio Spurs players
SIG Basket players
Sioux Falls Skyforce (CBA) players
Small forwards
Sportspeople from Toledo, Ohio
21st-century African-American people
20th-century African-American sportspeople